Milesia sexmaculata is a species of hoverfly in the family Syrphidae.

Distribution
India.

References

Insects described in 1915
Eristalinae
Diptera of Asia
Taxa named by Enrico Adelelmo Brunetti